Janet Jones (born 1961) is an American fitness celebrity and actress.

Janet Jones may also refer to:

Janet Dulin Jones, American screenwriter and producer
Janet Jones (artist) (born 1952), Canadian artist

See also
Jan Jones (disambiguation)
Janette Jones, Scottish nationalist politician